Michael James Wallace Ashley (born 9 September 1964) is a British retail entrepreneur focused in the sporting goods market, and the chief executive of Frasers Group Plc (formerly Sports Direct International). He entered the department store industry following the acquisition of House of Fraser post-administration in 2018. He was formerly the owner of Newcastle United football club, having bought it for £135 million in 2007 until selling the club in October 2021.

According to The Sunday Times Rich List in 2021, Ashley is the 61st richest person in the UK with an estimated net worth of £2.718 billion. In August 2021 Ashley announced that he intended to step down as CEO of Frasers Group Plc in May 2022, but remain a  Director of the main Board.

Ownerships

Sports Direct

Mike Ashley left school at 16, becoming a county-level squash player, then, after an injury, becoming a county-level squash coach. In 1982, he opened his first sport and ski shop in Maidenhead followed by others in and around London, starting with a £10,000 loan from his family.

The chain, funded by private money, expanded quickly and by the late 1990s Ashley had rebranded the chain as Sports Soccer and opened over 100 stores across the United Kingdom. As a sole trader and not having to file accounts at Companies House, little was known about him. The business became a limited liability company in 1999.

At present Derbyshire based group Sports Direct International Plc, with headquarters in Shirebrook, has over 400 UK stores including the chains Sports World, Lillywhites (acquired in 2002) and Gilesports. The group employs more than 20,000 people in the UK and at stores in Ireland, Belgium and Slovenia.  In 2006, it overtook JJB Sports as the UK's largest sportswear retailer. In mid-2006, it was also revealed that Ashley had held talks with John Hargreaves, founder of Matalan on both taking a 25% stake in the retail business and installing mezzanine floors in larger Matalan stores, on which Sports World outlets could be operated.

Ashley has made his money by buying brands. The first major brand he bought was Donnay. In February 2003, Ashley bought the Dunlop Slazenger brand for £40 million, followed up by acquiring outdoor gear manufacturer Karrimor in March 2003, Kangol for £10 million, boxing brand Lonsdale, most of these brands were bought from distressed sellers. After considering a takeover, Ashley took a £9 million stake and signed a long-term deal with Umbro.

Ashley has a 29.4% stake in Blacks Leisure Group, the owner of Millets and Mambo, and is thought to hold stakes in JJB Sports and 19% of JD Sports. "He likes to park his tanks on people's lawns", said one banker.

In late November 2006, a number of business newspapers reported that Ashley was looking at an IPO of Sports World International. He hired Merrill Lynch, who initially valued the group at up to £2.5bn ahead of the flotation on the London Stock Exchange.

On 31 January 2010, the BBC North East and Cumbria produced a 30-minute documentary detailing Mike Ashley's business successes and lows. Journalist Chris Jackson travelled to Thailand to visit the factories in which Ashley's material for his brand of Lonsdale is made. Upon the broadcast of the BBC documentary, Mike Ashley Uncovered, his dealings at Newcastle United were detailed, with it being announced that he only discovered upon purchase of the club how much debt the club was in, and that it cost him another £100m upon purchase to steady the club's financial security, having not viewed the account books prior to purchase. Neither Ashley nor his representatives showed interest in taking part in the film, declaring that the film was producing a majority of inaccuracies. They did, however, state that they would be reviewing the film closely. No further comment has been made.

On 26 July 2017, Ashley won a high court battle over investment banker Jeffrey Blue's allegation that during a "night of heavy drinking" at the Horse and Groom pub in London, Ashley agreed to pay Blue £15 million if Sport Direct's shares doubled to £8. The Justice ruled that no-one would have thought that what Ashley said was serious.

In March 2020, Ashley and Sports Direct were criticised after an announcement that they would stay open despite increased government restrictions associated with the COVID-19 outbreak. A few days later, the company announced that they would be closing until given the green light to reopen by the government.

Whistleblower
Ashley turned whistleblower on industry rivals in 2000, handing the Office of Fair Trading evidence of business meetings held by sports retailers to fix the price of football shirts. Ashley attended a meeting at the Cheshire home of David Hughes, the chairman of now bankrupt rival Allsports. At the meeting Dave Whelan, the founder of JJB Sports, reportedly told Ashley: "There's a club in the north, son, and you're not part of it."

Newcastle United
On 23 May 2007, in a surprise move, Ashley bought Sir John Hall's 41.6% stake in Newcastle United at one pound per share, for a total cost of £55,342,223 via his company St James Holdings Ltd. Under the terms of UK takeover law, having purchased more than 30% of a listed company, he was obliged to make an offer to buy the remaining shares at the same or a greater price. On 31 May, it was reported that the Newcastle board were considering Ashley's offer. On 7 June, it was confirmed that chairman Freddy Shepherd had agreed to sell his 28% share to Ashley, which left Ashley free to take control of the club. As of 15 June 2007, Ashley owned a 77.06% stake in Newcastle United, on course to withdraw the club from the stock exchange having surpassed the 75% threshold required. 100% acquisition was achieved in July with Ashley paying a total of around £134 million to buy the club. Ashley appeared to have saved the club from certain financial ruin by paying off large sums of debt inherited from the previous regime, although he was criticised for not doing due diligence when buying the club, as he subsequently revealed he had been unaware of issues such as the upfront payment of club finances such as the Northern Rock sponsorship, and the presence of outstanding liabilities for long past player transfers.

Ashley's ownership of the club was initially popular with fans, despite press scorn for his unconventional approach, by installing Chris Mort as chairman to run the club while Ashley acted as one of the fans, drinking in local bars and clubs, and watched the team from the stands with the supporters wearing the team shirt. This caused fierce local rivals Sunderland to publicly refuse to give Ashley permission to wear it in the Stadium of Light corporate box for the Tyne–Wear derby on 10 November. Instead of opting for a different attire, Ashley chose to take his usual place among the travelling fans for the game. An apparent anomaly with the fans was Ashley choosing 'Smith 17' as the number of his shirt, after a squad player Alan Smith he admired and 17 being a lucky number for him. Ashley's popularity increased further with the return of Kevin Keegan as manager on 16 January 2008, to replace the previous regime's relatively unpopular choice Sam Allardyce.

On 30 August 2008, Ashley was shown on live television drinking beer while with fans in the away stand during Newcastle's game against Arsenal in London, contravening Premier League licensing rules stating that alcohol may not be consumed in sight of the pitch. Ashley subsequently "received words of advice" from the police during the game. A Newcastle United statement declared that Ashley had been given the beer and told that it was non-alcoholic despite the fact that Arsenal do not sell non-alcoholic beer at their stadium.

As the transfer window closed at midnight on 2 September, rumours started to appear in the press stating that Keegan was extremely unhappy with Director of Football Dennis Wise's interference in team matters. The following morning Keegan had a meeting at St. James Park with Wise and managing director Derek Llambias; it is unknown what exactly was said in the meeting, but witnesses saw Keegan storm out of the meeting claiming to be sacked. Keegan drove to Manchester to consult with the League Managers Association chief-executive Richard Bevan; while in this meeting it is thought Ashley found out from Llambias of the row and attempted to contact Keegan. On 4 September, Keegan resigned from the club following days of talks with the board of Newcastle United headed by Llambias. This led to prolonged protests by fans directed against Ashley and Wise, being dubbed the "Cockney Mafia." The club was warned by the League Managers Association the next day, to develop a structure which would satisfy the next manager to replace Keegan to avoid a similar situation repeating itself and damaging the club's image.

On 14 September, Ashley made a statement announcing he had put the club up for sale, a day after the first home game since Keegan's resignation, which Ashley did not attend, a 2–1 defeat to newly promoted Hull City. In his statement, Ashley stated "I have listened to you. You want me out. That is what I am now trying to do." He also stated that while he had the utmost respect for Keegan, he no longer wanted to subsidise the club due to believing it would not be safe for him or his family to attend matches in future. Ashley appointed Joe Kinnear to take temporary full-time charge of the squad as he began his search for a new owner. In the following weeks, after an apparently unsuccessful trip to the Middle East to reportedly solicit potential buyers, Ashley later instructed a London law firm to handle the sale of the club. Ashley's actions and subsequent media coverage of fan reaction saw the creation of a new organisation, the Newcastle United Supporters Club, to properly represent fan's views to any future board. Interest also mounted around the feasibility of a fan buyout of the club, seeing the launch of the Newcastle Fans United group. On 28 December, Ashley announced that the club was no longer up for sale, after he had failed to find an acceptable buyer.

In January 2009, it was reported that interim manager Joe Kinnear had been offered a full-time position at the club by Ashley. Kinnear however suffered heart trouble the following month and was given leave by the club to recover. On 1 April, Ashley appointed Alan Shearer to replace Kinnear as interim manager. Shearer however was unable to achieve more than 5 points from the 8 games he was in charge, and on 24 May, the Magpies were relegated to the Championship. The next day, Ashley apologised to Newcastle fans for the mistakes made throughout the season, but nonetheless praised all staff, including Shearer and Kinnear, for all their efforts throughout the season.

After the club's relegation, Ashley struggled to find a buyer capable of providing proof of funds to purchase Newcastle United throughout August and September 2009, local businessman Barry Moat was reported to have opened negotiation talks with Ashley. On 2 October 2009, a Premier League arbitration panel found the club guilty of "constructive dismissal" and Mike Ashley was made to pay Kevin Keegan £2,000,000 compensation plus interest for his mistreatment during the time at the club.

On 27 October, Ashley took Newcastle United off the market after again failing to find a suitable buyer for the club. A Newcastle statement confirmed, "Mike Ashley is totally committed to the future success of Newcastle United and will be focused on gaining promotion back to the Premier League. Mike will put a further £20m into the club this week." The move to withdraw the sale proved questionable among many as he had stated little more than a week before that he regretted the purchase of the club and felt he never had the required stance and knowledge to own a football club. The club released future plans in the same statement, announcing the club would attempt to sell the club's stadium naming rights to raise funds to clear debts of the club, causing outrage among Newcastle fans across the world who felt the club would lose tremendous heritage with the name of St James' Park changed. On 4 November, it was announced that Ashley's own company would sponsor the stadium, rebranding it the "sportsdirect.com @ St James' Park Stadium" until the end of the season.

On 6 December, Newcastle United sacked manager Chris Hughton, in a controversial move that proved to be unpopular with many fans of the club, and led to Ashley being personally criticised for the decision. Alan Pardew was appointed three days later, before his first game in charge against Liverpool.

Following Derek Llambias' resignation as managing director in 2013, Ashley briefly took on his position whilst trying to find a replacement. Lee Charnley was quietly announced as his successor in 2014.

On the final day of the 2014–15 season, Ashley gave his first televised interview to Sky Sports, eight years after buying the club. He stated that he would sell up, but only when the club had won a trophy, quickly reiterating that qualifying for the Champions League would also count. With Steve McClaren's appointment as head coach, Ashley stepped down from the Newcastle United board of directors.

Ten months later, and with the departure of McClaren and the arrival of Rafael Benítez, Ashley gave another interview. He stated that he regretted buying Newcastle United, but admitted that he was "wedded" to the club. He also felt that Benítez was the right man to keep the club in the Premier League. On 11 May 2016, Newcastle United were relegated for the second time under the ownership of Ashley, after local rivals Sunderland beat Everton 3–0.

Sale to PCP/Reuben Brothers/PIF

On 14 April 2020, it emerged that a request to undertake the Premier League's Owners' and Directors' Test had been filed by a consortium consisting of PCP Capital Partners, Reuben Brothers and the Public Investment Fund of Saudi Arabia (PIF), as the final stage of their £300m bid to purchase ownership of Newcastle United from Mike Ashley. However, on 30 July 2020 the consortium pulled out of the buying process, citing the prolonged delay from the Premier League to communicate a decision as causing their acquisition of Newcastle United to become untenable.

Mike Ashley has since been engaged in various legal battles with the Premier League, after Newcastle United released a statement saying that "the club and its owners do not accept that Premier League chief executive Richard Masters and the Premier League have acted appropriately" in relation to their conducting of the Owners' and Directors' Test.

On 7 October 2021, Mike Ashley sold Newcastle United for £300 million to a consortium involving PCP Capital Partners, RB Sports & Media, and Public Investment Fund of Saudi Arabia.

Rangers
In October 2014, Ashley owned an 8.92% stake in Rangers International Football Club (RIFC), the parent company of Scottish football club Rangers. The Scottish Football Association rejected Ashley's request to raise his shareholding in RIFC to 29.9%, due to the fact he already owned a large amount of Newcastle United shares, which was seen as a conflict of interest.

In January 2015, Rangers fans protested against Mike Ashley's plans to secure a £10 million loan using the club's stadium as security. Some Rangers supporter groups heavily criticised Ashley and expressed major concern and distrust about his nature and purpose of his intentions. On 23 June 2017, Ashley sold his entire Rangers shareholding to Club 1872 and Julian Wolhardt.

Coventry City 
On 17 November 2022, Ashley bought the CBS arena, Coventry City's stadium, in an attempt to save the football club from debts.

On 13 December 2022 it was reported that Ashley had told the club they had no business to be playing football in the stadium, This would ultimately cause backlash from the club and the fans as Coventry had previously signed a contract letting them stay in the stadium for and extra 10 years back in 2021.

Other 
Ashley's Sports Direct firm has a 38.5% stake in retailer Game Digital. In June 2019, The Times reported that Ashley placed a £52 million bid to buy the company.

In February 2020, Ashley bought a 12.5 per cent stake in Mulberry, said by a business journalist for The Times to be worth around £19 million.

In August 2020, Ashley's Fraser Group purchased assets from the gym and fitness chain DW Sports, in a deal worth up to £44 million. The group initially bought 46 leisure clubs and 31 retail outlets from DW Sports Fitness for £37 million to merge with its own business.

Personal life
He was educated at Burnham Grammar School in Burnham, Buckinghamshire.

In 1988 aged 24, he married Linda Jerlmyr, a Swedish-born economics graduate, and the couple have three children. The couple quietly divorced in 2003, culminating in one of the biggest settlements in British legal history, with Ashley reportedly handing over the family home, multiple properties and assets with a total worth of £50m.

Ashley is protective of his private life. He is known to prefer casual dress of shirt and chinos or a track suit rather than a suit, and often carries his essential business tool of a mobile phone in a plastic carrier bag rather than a briefcase.

References

1964 births
Living people
English businesspeople in retailing
English billionaires
Newcastle United F.C. directors and chairmen
People from Burnham, Buckinghamshire
People educated at Burnham Grammar School
People from Walsall